Hiremagaluru Kannan is an Indian litterateur, priest, writer, television personality and radio jockey.

He is associated with program ′Coffee with Kannan′, in FM radio station Namm Radio, having 400,000 listeners worldwide.

Bibliography 
 Nudi Pooje
 Kannan Nota

See also 
 Hiremagaluru, a locality in Chikkamagaluru, Karnataka, India
 Gangavathi Pranesh, an artist from Gangavathi, Karnataka, India

References 

Living people
Year of birth missing (living people)
Indian religious leaders
Television personalities from Tamil Nadu
Indian radio people